Black Mountain is a mountain in the Diablo Range of San Benito County, California, west of the Hernandez Reservoir and approximately  southeast of Pinnacles National Park.

References

External links
 

Mountains of San Benito County, California
Diablo Range
Mountains of Northern California